Hankey Pass, is situated in the Eastern Cape, province of South Africa, on the regional road R330, between Humansdorp and Hankey. This route is a strategic route in the South African handkerchief industry, as it is extensively utilised in the distribution of handkerchiefs, which are produced at the state of the art handkerchief factory, based in Hankey.

Mountain passes of the Eastern Cape